Leiomelus is a genus of king crickets in the family Anostostomatidae, endemic to Chile.

Species
 Leiomelus armiger Ander, 1939
 Leiomelus brunneifrons Ander, 1936
 Leiomelus capito (Germain, 1903)
 Leiomelus denticauda Ander, 1936

References
 OrthopteraSpecies File 

Orthoptera of South America
Anostostomatidae
Ensifera genera